The Tampin District is a district in Negeri Sembilan, Malaysia.

Tampin District is surrounded by Tangkak and Segamat Districts, Johor to the southwest, Jasin and Alor Gajah Districts, Malacca to the south, Rembau District to the west, Kuala Pilah District to the northwest and Jempol District to the north. The geographical southern terminus of the Titiwangsa Mountains, the longest mountain range in Malaysia, is located in this district.

Administrative divisions

Tampin District is divided into 7 mukims, which are:
 Ayer Kuning
 Gemas
 Gemencheh
 Keru
 Repah
 Tampin Tengah
 Tebong

Demographics

Federal Parliament and State Assembly Seats 

List of Tampin district representatives in the Federal Parliament (Dewan Rakyat) 

List of Tampin district representatives in the State Legislative Assembly (Dewan Undangan Negeri)

References

External links